The surname Kolb originates from the Middle High German "kolbe", with various meanings. The main sense is a mace – a heavy medieval war club with a spiked or flanged metal head, used to crush armor, or a cudgel – a short heavy club with a rounded head used as a weapon and part of an official’s insignia. It may also be a house name – there is a record of a house named Zum Kolben in Strasbourg.
Abram Bowman Kolb (1862–1925), Canadian teacher and publisher
Adrienne Kolb, American historian of science, married to Edward
Alexander Kolb (1891–1963), German general
Alphonse A. Kolb (1893–1983), German-American artist
Annette Kolb (1870–1967), German pacifist
Barbara Kolb (born 1939), U.S. composer
Brandon Kolb (born 1973), U.S. baseball player
Brian Kolb (born 1952), U.S. politician
Bubba Kolb (born 1940), jazz pianist
Carol Kolb (unknown), U.S. comedy writer
Chris Kolb (1958), U.S. politician
Clarence Kolb (1874–1964), U.S. vaudeville performer
Claudia Kolb (born 1949), U.S. swimmer
Dan Kolb (born 1975), U.S. baseball player
David Kolb (born 1941), U.S. philosopher
David A. Kolb (born 1939), U.S. educationist
Eberhard Kolb (born 1933), historian
Edward Kolb (born 1951), American cosmologist, married to Adrienne
Eugen Kolb (1898–1959), art critic
Frank Kolb (born 1945), German historian
Franz Kolb  (unknown), German inventor
Gary Kolb (1940–2019), U.S. baseball player
John Kolb, American politician
Jon Kolb (born 1947), U.S. football player
Kevin Kolb (born 1984), U.S. football player.
Larry Kolb  (unknown), U.S. CIA operative and writer
Lawrence Kolb (1911–2006), U.S. psychiatrist
Ophélia Kolb (born 1982), French actress
Michael J. Kolb (born c. 1960s), U.S. archaeologist
Robert Kolb (born c. 1940), U.S. theologian, systematician
Steven Kolb, American businessman
Thomas Kolb, American radiologist

References

See also 
 Kolbe
 Kulp (surname)
 Culp

German-language surnames